Sebastian de Chaves (born 30 October 1990) is a South African rugby union footballer who plays for Austin Gilgronis of Major League Rugby (MLR). He plays as a Lock.

Club career
De Chaves initially played with the Golden Lions, reaching an Under-19s Currie Cup Final in 2009 and playing Vodacom Cup rugby in 2012. In the same year, De Chaves moved to Stade Montois in France, newly promoted into the Top14. De Chaves again moved team in 2013, this time to Aviva Premiership club Leicester Tigers.

On 31 March 2016 it was announced that De Chaves would join English side London Irish on a two-year deal from the end of the 2015–2016 season.

He joined Newcastle Falcons ahead of the 2019–20 RFU Championship season.

In August 2020, de Chaves signed for former club London Irish on a short-term deal for the remainder of the Premiership Rugby season. He was due to return to Newcastle Falcons ahead of their return to Premiership Rugby; however, he signed for Major League Rugby side Austin Gilgronis ahead of the 2021 season.

On 15 September 2021, he returned to England once again as he signed a short-term deal with Wasps from the 2021-22 season.

International career
De Chaves is qualified to play for South Africa, Portugal and England. However, as of 2014, De Chaves has only represented the South African Under-20s Team, playing for them in the 2010 IRB Junior World Championship and finishing in third place.

References

External links 
 Leicester Tigers Profile
 

1990 births
Living people
Rugby union players from Johannesburg
Rugby union locks
South African rugby union players
South Africa Under-20 international rugby union players
Leicester Tigers players
London Irish players
South African people of Portuguese descent
Golden Lions players
Stade Montois players
Newcastle Falcons players
Austin Gilgronis players
Wasps RFC players